The Consultive Junta was the government of the province of El Salvador from 25 May 1823 to 17 June 1823.

The junta was composed of:

 Mariano Prado, Supreme Political Chief
 Colonel José Justo Milla, Intendant and Governor of the Province of San Salvador
 Colonel José Rivas, Military Commander

References 

History of El Salvador